The Régiment Blindé de Fusiliers-Marins or (RBFM) was an armored naval infantry regiment of the French 2nd Armored Division. The regiment belonged to the units of the French Fusiliers Marins which are units of the French Navy whose ships were either immobilized or destroyed.

History 
In November 1942, Anglo-American troops invaded North Africa and were joined by a group of Fusiliers-Marins (45 Fusiliers-Marins and 333 Officiers Mariniers, Able Seamen and Sailors) who volunteered to serve alongside Allied forces. These volunteers were armed with U.S. equipment and served as reconnaissance troops, becoming known as the Bizerte Battalion.

Organisation 
On 19 September 1943, the Bizerte Battalion was redesignated the Régiment Blindé de Fusiliers-Marins. They were then moved to Casablanca, Morocco where they were joined by other volunteers who replaced those Marines who had returned to naval service.

At Berkane, Morocco, they underwent training on the M10 tank destroyer, alongside the 11th African Chasseur Regiment.

Under the command of Naval Ship-of-the-line captain Maggiar, assisted by capitaine de corvette Martinet, the RBFM was equipped with 36 M10s, 25 M3 Scout Cars, 6 M2 half-tracks, 3 M3 Half-tracks and other vehicles and were integrated into the French 2nd Armored Division.

The RBFM was organised into 5 squadrons:

 Headquarters staff squadron
 1st Squadron commanded by a Naval Lieutenant de Vaisseau (LV)
 2nd Squadron commanded by a Naval Lieutenant de Vaisseau 
 3rd Squadron commanded by a Naval Lieutenant de Vaisseau 
 4th Squadron commanded by a Naval Lieutenant de Vaisseau

In addition a female ambulance platoon, the Marinettes, part of the 13th Medical Battalion, commanded by a female Enseigne de vaisseau was attached to the Regiment.

Campaigns

Arrival in Normandy
The 2nd Armored Division began disembarking on French soil at 01:30 on 3 August 1944, at Saint Martin de Varreville, the coast of Utah Beach.

On 6 August the 2nd Armored Division began its advance in the direction of Coutances, La Haye-Fresnel, Avranches, Ducey and Saint-Laurent-de-Terregate.

Liberation of Paris
The RBFM played an active role in the liberation of Paris by penetrating the city in three places as follows: 
 the 4th Squadron attacked towards the Pont de Sèvres, which was reached on the night of 24 July, despite strong resistance
 the 3rd squadron proceeded through Arpajon, Longjumeau, Antony, Sceaux, to arrive by the Porte d'Orléans, Porte de Gentilly and Porte d'Italie while progressing in the direction of Hötel de Ville to finish at the Hotel Meurice
 1st and 2nd Squadrons along with the Regimental command post proceeded through Trappes and Voisins-le-Bretonneux where one of the M10 tank destroyers fired on the bell tower of the church, which was being used as a German observation post.

Later the 1st and 2nd squadrons were positioned at the Hippodrome de Longchamp, the 3rd squadron at Le Bourget, while the 4th squadron was positioned at the Fort de Briche, at Saint Denis.

Since Normandy, the regiment destroyed some 60 German tanks for the loss of 10 M10 tank destroyers.

Dompaire

The 2nd Armor Division advanced into Lorraine and at Dompaire, the regiment's M10 tank destroyers accompanied by U.S. Thunderbolts destroyed an entire panzer brigade.

Liberation of Strasbourg
Units of the RBFM regrouped for an assault on Strasbourg. The regiment attacked at Baccarat and Phalsbourg, ending their assault at Pont de Kehl.

Notable members 
 Philippe de Gaulle
 Jean-Alexis Moncorgé

Distinctions 
The RBFM was not a unit of the Free French Forces nor was it part of the Free French Naval Forces, accordingly, their members couldn't wear the insignia of the Free French.

The Régiment Blindé de Fusiliers-Marins was decorated with the fourragère de la Légion d'Honneur des Fusiliers Marins de Dixmude, awarded in May 1944.

Reconstitution 
Dissolved, the regiment was reconstituted as a Marine Amphibious Regiment in the French Far East Expeditionary Corps.

See also 
Brigade de Fusiliers Marins
List of Allied forces in the Normandy Campaign
1er Régiment de Fusiliers Marins

References

Notes

External links 

 Le RBFM consulté le 15 juin 2012 
 Souffleur II et Jean Gabin
 Récit du Quartier-Maître Warter, TD Mistral
 Les chars-français 1944 RBFM consulté le 16/06/2012 
 Le RBFM de la 2e DB dans les Vosges consulté le 16/06/2012 
 Bachis et Guêtres
 Musée des fusiliers marins et commandos

Military history of France during World War II
Military units and formations established in 1943
Military units and formations disestablished in 1945
20th-century regiments of France